Greatest Hits is a greatest hits album by Greek singer Demis Roussos, released in late 1973 or early 1974 on Philips Records.

Commercial performance
The album spent eight weeks in the Dutch album chart in January–March 1974, peaking at no. 3.

Track listing
LP Philips 6499 724 (Netherlands)

Charts

Weekly charts

Year-end charts

References

External links
 Demis Roussos – Greatest Hits at Discogs
 Demis Roussos – Greatest Hits at Dutchcharts.nl

1974 compilation albums
Demis Roussos albums
Philips Records albums